2-Hydroxyphytanoyl-CoA lyase is a peroxisomal enzyme involved in the catabolism of phytanoic acid by α-oxidation. It requires thiamine diphosphate (ThDP) as cofactor.

It is classified under EC number 4.1.

References

External links

EC 4.1